Chomu Assembly constituency is one of constituencies of Rajasthan Legislative Assembly in the Sikar (Lok Sabha constituency).

Chomu constituency covers all voters from parts of Chomu tehsil, which include ILRC Chomu including Chomu Municipal Board, ILRC Govindgarh, ILRC Kaladera; and Singod Kalan, Singod Khurd, Itawa Bhopji and Udaipuriya of ILRC Khejroli.

References

See also 
 Member of the Legislative Assembly (India)

Jaipur district
Assembly constituencies of Rajasthan